The 127 mm (5")/54 caliber (Mk 45) lightweight gun is a U.S. naval artillery gun mount consisting of a  L54 Mark 19 gun on the Mark 45 mount. It was designed and built by United Defense, a company later acquired by BAE Systems Land & Armaments, which continued manufacture.

The latest 62-calibre-long version consists of a longer-barrel L62 Mark 36 gun fitted on the same Mark 45 mount. The gun is designed for use against surface warships, anti-aircraft and shore bombardment to support amphibious operations. The gun mount features an automatic loader with a capacity of 20 rounds. These can be fired under full automatic control, taking a little over a minute to exhaust those rounds at maximum fire rate. For sustained use, the gun mount would be occupied by a six-person crew (gun captain, panel operator, and four ammunition loaders) below deck to keep the gun continuously supplied with ammunition.

History 
Development started in the 1960s as a replacement for the 127 mm (5")/54 caliber Mark 42 gun system that had debuted in 1953 with a new, lighter, and easier-to-maintain gun mounting. The United States Navy use the Mark 45 with either the Mk 86 Gun Fire Control System or the Mk 34 Gun Weapon System. Since before World War II, 127 mm (5 inches) has been the standard gun caliber for U.S. Naval ships. Its rate of fire is lower than the British  gun, but it fires a heavier 127 mm (5-inch) shell which carries a larger burst charge that increases its effectiveness against aircraft.

Variants 

 Mod 0: used mechanical fuze setter. Two-piece rifled construction, with replaceable liner
 Mod 1: electronic fuze setter replaces the mechanical one. Made with a unitary construction barrel, which has a life span approximately twice that of the Mark 42 gun.
 Mod 2: export version of Mod 1, but now used in the U.S. Navy
 Mod 3: same gun with a new control system; never put into production
 Mod 4: longer 62-caliber barrel (versus Mod 1 and 2's 54 caliber) for more complete propellant combustion and higher velocity and thus more utility for land attack. Was designed to use the Mark 171 Extended Range Guided Munition (ERGM), which was canceled. The Mk 45 mod 4 uses a modified flat-panel gun turret, designed to reduce its radar signature.

In sustained firing operations (Mode III), the gun is operated by a six-person crew: a gun captain, a panel operator, and four ammunition loaders, all located below decks. In fully automatic non-sustained firing operations (Mode IV), 20 rounds can be fired without any personnel inside the mount, using an automatic loader.

Ammunition 
Mark 68 HE-CVT
Weight - 68.5 lb (31.1 kg)
Projectile Length - 26.1 in (66.3 cm)
Used only on Mods 0-2

Mark 80 HE-PD
Weight - 67.6 lb (30.7 kg)
Projectile Length - 26 in (66 cm)

Mark 91 Illum-MT
Weight - 63.9 lb (29.0 kg)
Projectile Length - 26.1 in (66.3 cm)

Mark 116 HE-VT
Weight - 69.7 lb (31.6 kg)
Projectile Length - 26 in (66 cm)

Mark 127 HE-CVT
Weight - 68.6 lb (31.1 kg)
Projectile Length - 26 in (66 cm)

Mark 156 HE-IR
Weight - 69.0 lb (31.3 kg)
Projectile Length - 26 in (66 cm)

Guided shell 

On 9 May 2014, the U.S. Navy released a request for information (RFI) for a guided 127 mm (5-inch) round that could be fired from Mark 45 guns on Navy destroyers and cruisers. The thinking is that if the technology worked in the  Long Range Land Attack Projectile (LRLAP) for the Advanced Gun System on s, it can be applied to a 127 mm (5-inch) mount. This RFI comes six years after the cancelation of the Raytheon Extended Range Guided Munition. The shell must have at least double the range of unguided shells for missions including Naval Surface Fire Support (NSFS)/Land Attack, and increasing anti-surface warfare (ASuW) capabilities against fast attack craft (FAC) and fast inshore attack craft (FIAC); the main purpose is to destroy incoming small boats at a greater range with a proximity fuse airburst blast fragmentation warhead to spray shrapnel over swarms.  

Expected submissions include the BAE Systems Multi Service–Standard Guided Projectile (MS-SGP), Raytheon Excalibur N5, and OTO Melara Vulcano guided long-range projectile.

Naval Sea Systems Command is also looking to fire a version of the hyper-velocity projectile (HVP) developed for Navy electromagnetic railguns from conventional 5-inch deck guns. Using the HVP could give existing destroyers and cruisers better ability to engage land, air, and missile threats and allow more time to refine the railgun. The HVP would be a cheaper solution to intercepting incoming missiles than a missile interceptor costing hundreds of thousands of dollars. Converting the HVP to fire from conventional guns was not a program of record . HVP shells fired from 5-inch deck guns would travel at Mach 3, half the speed of a railgun but twice the speed of conventional rounds. During 2018 RIMPAC exercises, the  fired 20 HVPs from a standard Mk 45 deck gun; an HVP shell could cost US$75,000-$100,000, compared to $1-$2 million for missiles.

Operators

Current operators 

Royal Australian Navy
 Anzac-class frigate: Mod 4 (upgraded from Mod 2)
 Hobart-class destroyer: Mod 4

Royal Danish Navy
 Absalon-class frigate: Mod 2

Hellenic Navy
 Hydra-class frigate (MEKO 200 HN)

 Mogami-class frigate: Mod 4
 Atago-class destroyer: Mod 4
 Maya-class destroyer: Mod 4
 Akizuki-class destroyer: Mod 4
 Asahi-class destroyer: Mod 4

Republic of Korea Navy
 Sejong the Great-class destroyer: Mod 4
 Chungmugong Yi Sun-sin-class destroyer: Mod 4
 Incheon-class frigate: Mod 4

Royal New Zealand Navy
 Anzac-class frigate: Mod 2

Spanish Navy
 Álvaro de Bazán-class frigate: Mod 2

Republic of China Navy
 Kee Lung-class destroyer

Royal Thai Navy
 Naresuan-class frigate: Mod 2 (being upgraded to Mod 4)

Turkish Navy
 Barbaros-class frigate (MEKO 200 TN II)
 Yavuz-class frigate (MEKO 200 TN I)

United States Navy
Active service ships:
 Ticonderoga-class cruiser: Mod 2
 CG-52-73: Mod 4 after receiving the cruiser modernization
 Arleigh Burke-class destroyer:
 DDG 51–80: Mod 2
 DDG 81–112: Mod 4

Decommissioned:
 California-class cruiser
 Kidd-class cruiser
 Spruance-class destroyer
 Tarawa-class amphibious assault ship (later removed)
 Virginia-class cruiser

Future operators 

Royal Australian Navy

Hunter-class frigate: 9 ships ordered

Royal Navy
 Type 26 frigate: 8 ships ordered, 3 in build (Mod 4)

Turkish Navy
 TF2000-class frigate: 7 in planned

See also 
 Extended Range Guided Munition: long range (~) precision guided projectile program by Raytheon for the Mark 45 gun, canceled in 2008
 Advanced Gun System: The  gun on s (unusable; no ammunition)

Weapons of comparable role, performance and era 
 Otobreda 127/54 Compact and Otobreda 127/64: contemporary 127 mm naval gun from Italian manufacturer Oto Melara
 4.5 inch Mark 8 naval gun: contemporary standard naval gun for British ships
 AK-130: contemporary 130 mm twin standard naval gun mounting for Russian ships
 H/PJ-38 130mm naval gun : contemporary 130 mm standard naval gun mounting for Chinese ships
 French 100 mm naval gun: contemporary standard naval gun for French ships

References

Notes

Bibliography

External links 

 US Navy Fact File – 5"/54 caliber Mark 45 gun 
 BAE Systems: Mk 45 Mod 4 Naval Gun System
 BAE Systems: Mk 45 Naval Gun Overhaul and Upgrade
 NavWeaps.Com: 5"/54 (12.7 cm) Mark 45 Mods 0 – 2
 NavWeaps.Com: 5"/62 (12.7 cm) Mark 45 Mod 4
 FAS: Gunner officer information sheet
 

127 mm artillery
5 inch
Naval guns of the United States
Naval weapons of the Cold War
Military equipment introduced in the 1970s